Lisbon is a town in Androscoggin County, Maine. The population was 9,711 at the 2020 census. It is included in both the Lewiston-Auburn, Maine metropolitan statistical area and the Lewiston–Auburn, Maine Metropolitan New England city and town area. The town of Lisbon includes the villages of Lisbon and Lisbon Falls.

History
The community was originally part of Bowdoin, a township within the Kennebec Purchase. But because travel to attend town meetings was difficult, on June 22, 1799, the General Court of Massachusetts divided Bowdoin in two to create Thompsonborough. Residents, however, soon grew dissatisfied with the long name. Consequently, it would be renamed in 1802 as Lisbon, after Lisbon in Portugal. In 1808, Lisbon annexed the remainder of Little River Plantation (part of the Pejepscot Purchase) as Lisbon Falls. In 1840, part of Lisbon was set off as Webster.

With fertile and easily cultivated soil, farming was an early industry. Sawmills and gristmills were built using water power from the streams. Larger brick mills followed to manufacture textiles. In 1864, the Worumbo Mill was established to produce woolens, and would remain a principal employer until it burned in 1987. Today, the small mill town is largely a bedroom community for companies like Bath Iron Works and L.L.Bean and increasingly for people working in the Portland area.

Geography
Lisbon is drained by the Sabattus River, Little River and Androscoggin River.

Demographics

2010 census
As of the census of 2010, there were 9,009 people, 3,696 households, and 2,477 families living in the town. The racial makeup of the town was 96.2% White; 0.6% African American; 0.5% Native American; 0.5% Asian; 0.3% from other races; and 1.9% from two or more races. Hispanic or Latino of any race were 1.0% of the population.

There were 3,696 households, of which 32.4% had children under the age of 18 living with them; 49.4% were married couples living together; 11.7% had a female householder with no husband present,; 5.9% had a male householder with no wife present, and 33.0% were non-families. 26.0% of all households were made up of individuals; and 8.8% had someone living alone who was 65 years of age or older. The average household size was 2.43 and the average family size was 2.90.

The median age in the town was 39.4 years. 23.5% of residents were under the age of 18; 8.3% were between the ages of 18 and 24; 26.7% were from 25 to 44; 28.8% were from 45 to 64; and 12.8% were 65 years of age or older. The gender makeup of the town was 49.0% male and 51.0% female.

2000 census
As of the census of 2000, there were 9,077 people, 3,608 households, and 2,485 families living in the town. The racial makeup of the town was 97.41% White; 0.65% African American; 0.22% Native American; 0.39% Asian, 0.10% Pacific Islander, 0.31% from other races; and 0.93% from two or more races. Hispanic or Latino of any race were 0.74% of the population.

There were 3,608 households, out of which 34.1% had children under the age of 18 living with them, 53.3% were married couples living together, 11.2% had a female householder with no husband present, and 31.1% were non-families. 24.4% of all households were made up of individuals, and 9.1% had someone living alone who was 65 years of age or older. The average household size was 2.51 and the average family size was 2.97.

In the town, the population was spread out, with 26.5% under the age of 18; 8.3% from 18 to 24; 31.7% from 25 to 44; 21.9% from 45 to 64; and 11.6% who were 65 years of age or older. The median age was 36 years. For every 100 females, there were 96.2 males. For every 100 females age 18 and over, there were 93.2 males.

The median income for a household in the town was $38,115, and the median income for a family was $42,614. Males had a median income of $32,107 versus $21,099 for females. The per capita income for the town was $17,263. About 6.7% of families and 8.4% of the population were below the poverty line, including 10.6% of those under age 18 and 8.3% of those age 65 or over.

Voter registration

Education
The Lisbon School Department includes three schools: Lisbon Community School, Philip W. Sugg Middle School and Lisbon High School.

Rick Green is the Superintendent of Schools.

Notable people 

 Dale J. Crafts, state legislator
 William Dunn, sailor
 Benjamin Franklin Dunning, builder
 Howard Gerrish, author and teacher
 John Gould, columnist
 Louis A. Jack, state legislator and President of the Maine Board of Trade
 Stephen King, writer
 Hannah Hanson Kinney, alleged murderer
 Garrett Mason, state legislator
 Gina Mason, state legislator
 Greg Moore, hockey forward
 James Tierney, politician

References

External links
 Town of Lisbon, Maine
 Lisbon Village Branch Library

 
Towns in Androscoggin County, Maine
Towns in Maine